Iannuzzi may refer to:

Carol Iannuzzi (fl. 2020s), former candidate for United States Congress in 2020
Dan Iannuzzi (1934–2004), full name Daniel Andrèa Iannuzzi, a Canadian entrepreneur
Gaetano Iannuzzi (born 1972), full name Gaetano Iannuzzi, an Italian rowing coach
Joseph Iannuzzi (1930/31–2015), Gambino crime family associate also known as "Joe Dogs", "Joe Diner" and "Joe Drywall"
Juan Alberto Iannuzzi (born 1941), Argentine rower
Marco Iannuzzi (born 1987), Canadian football wide receiver
Yanina Iannuzzi (born 1973), Argentine fencer
Lino Jannuzzi (born 1928), Italian journalist

Italian-language surnames
Patronymic surnames
Surnames from given names